The Sanitary Act 1866 (29 & 30 Vict c 90), sometimes called the Public Health Act 1866, was an Act of the Parliament of the United Kingdom. The Act allowed the formation of drainage districts and enabled the provision of better house drainage. The second part of the Act dealt with nuisances and stated that it was the duty of councils to locate nuisances and remove them.

From and after 1 November 1867, the Sanitary Act 1866, so far as it applied to Scotland, was repealed by section 2 of the Public Health (Scotland) Act 1867 (30 & 31 Vict c 101). The whole Act, so far as it related to Ireland, was repealed by sections 279 and 294 of, and Schedule A to, the Public Health (Ireland) Act 1878. The whole Act, except section 41, was repealed by section 142(1) of, and the Fourth Schedule to, the Public Health (London) Act 1891 (54 & 55 Vict c 76).

Parts I, II and III, except so far as related to the Metropolis or to Scotland or Ireland, were repealed by section 343 of, and Part I of Schedule V to, the Public Health Act 1875 (38 & 39 Vict c 55).

Section 4
This section was repealed by section 14 of the Public Health Act 1872 (35 & 36 Vict c 79). Glen said that the effect of this was that "the town council, as far as regards appointments of committees for purposes of the Sanitary Acts, must proceed under the Municipal Corporation Acts, or under" section 36 of the Public Health Act 1848 (11 & 12 Vict c 63).

Section 19
The words "not already under the operation of any general Act for the regulation of factories or bakehouses" (so far as unrepealed) were repealed by section 107 of, and the Sixth Schedule to, the Factory and Workshop Act 1878 (41 & 42 Vict c 16).

Section 41
This section was repealed by section 308 of, and the Seventh Schedule to, the Public Health (London) Act 1936 (26 Geo 5 & 1 Edw 8 c 50).

References
Michael, William Henry. The Sanitary Acts: Comprising the Sewage Utilization Act, 1865, and the Sanitary Act, 1866, and various selections of other Acts incorporated therewith. H Sweet. Stevens and Sons. London. 1867. Google Books. Internet Archive.
Austin, Robert Cecil. The Sanitary Act, 1866, with Notes, Statutes, &c. Nicholls Bros. Frederick Street, London. 1867. Internet Archive.
Hutchins, James B. The Sanitary Act, 1866 (29 & 30 Vict., c. 90); and the Sewage Utilization Acts of 1865 and 1867 (28 & 29 Vict. c. 75, and 30 & 31 Vict. c. 113). Third Edition. Knight and Co. London. 1867.
"The Sanitary Act, 1866". Halsbury's Statutes of England. (The Complete Statutes of England). First Edition. Butterworth & Co (Publishers) Limited. 1930. Volume 11. Pages 1005 to 1006.
Paterson, William (ed). "Public Health Act". The Practical Statutes of the Session 1866. Horace Cox. Wellington Street, London. 1866. Pages 178 to 202.

United Kingdom Acts of Parliament 1866
Urban society in the United Kingdom
Public health in the United Kingdom
Health law in the United Kingdom